= F.I.T. =

F.I.T. may refer to:

Organizations

- Fashion Institute of Technology
- Florida Institute of Technology
- Free Institute of Trainee

Footscray Institute of Technology (Melbourne Australia)
